Werner Kofler (23 July 1947 – 8 December 2011) was an Austrian novelist was born in Villach, Austria, and died in Vienna.

Life 
Werner Kofler was the son of a merchant. He broke off his teacher training at the teacher training college in Klagenfurt after four years and went travelling. Afterwards he practised various activities. From 1963 on he was engaged in literary activities; since 1968 he lived as a writer in his chosen home-town Vienna.

Works (in translation) 
 At the Writing Desk, translated by Lauren Wolfe (2016)

See also 
 List of Austrian writers
 List of Austrians

References

External links 
 Dalkey Archive Press catalog entry for At the Writing Desk

1947 births
2011 deaths
People from Villach
20th-century Austrian novelists
Austrian male novelists
20th-century Austrian male writers